José of Braganza, High Inquisitor of Portugal (Lisbon, 8 September 1720 – Lisbon, 31 July 1801) was a Portuguese clergyman, and the illegitimate son of John V of Portugal and Paula de Odivelas. He was High Inquisitor of the Portuguese Inquisition. He was one of the three Children of Palhavã.

1720 births
1801 deaths
18th-century Portuguese people
19th-century Portuguese people
Clergy from Lisbon
Illegitimate children of John V of Portugal
Burials at the Monastery of São Vicente de Fora
Sons of kings